Shah Jahan III (b. 1711 – d. 1772), also known as Mirza Muhi-ul-millat (Persian: میرزا محی الملت), was the sixteenth Mughal Emperor, albeit briefly. He was the son of Muhi us-Sunnat, the eldest son of Muhammad Kam Bakhsh who was the youngest son of Aurangzeb. He was placed on the Mughal throne in December 1759 as a result of the intricacies in Delhi with the help of Imad-ul-Mulk. He was later deposed by Mughal chiefs, acting in the name of the exiled Mughal Emperor Shah Alam II.

References

Mughal emperors
1772 deaths
Indian Muslims
Year of birth unknown
1711 births